Calicivirin (Camberwell virus processing peptidase, Chiba virus processing peptidase, Norwalk virus processing peptidase, Southampton virus processing peptidase, norovirus virus processing peptidase, calicivirus trypsin-like cysteine protease, calicivirus TCP, calicivirus 3C-like protease, calicivirus endopeptidase, rabbit hemorrhagic disease virus 3C endopeptidase) is an enzyme. This enzyme catalyses the following chemical reaction

 Endopeptidase with a preference for cleavage when the P1 position is occupied by Glu- and the P1- position is occupied by Gly-

Viruses that are members of the genus Norovirus (family Caliciviridae) are a major cause of epidemic acute viral gastroenteritis.

References

External links 
 

EC 3.4.22